Turbonilla guerrai is a species of sea snail, a marine gastropod mollusk in the family Pyramidellidae, the pyrams and their allies.

Description
The length of the shell varies between 6 mm and 11 mm.

Distribution
This species occurs in the Pacific Ocean off the Loyalty Islands and Fiji.

References

External links
 To Encyclopedia of Life
 To World Register of Marine Species

guerrai
Gastropods described in 2010